The 1987 Toronto Blue Jays season was the franchise's 11th season of Major League Baseball. It resulted in the Blue Jays finishing second in the American League East with a record of 96 wins and 66 losses. They had been in first place by 3½ games over the Detroit Tigers with a week left to play, but they dropped their next seven games in a row, capped off by a sweep at the hands of Detroit at Tiger Stadium on the last weekend of the season, and lost the division by two games.

Offseason
 October 20, 1986: Dennis Lamp was released by the Blue Jays.
 February 2, 1987: Luis Leal and Dámaso García were traded by the Blue Jays to the Atlanta Braves for Craig McMurtry.
 March 26, 1987: Ron Shepherd was released by the Blue Jays.

Regular season
 Blue Jays left fielder George Bell drove in 134 runs to lead the American League, along with 47 home runs, and was selected the league's Most Valuable Player in a close vote over the Tigers' Alan Trammell.
Tom Henke established himself as an elite closer, as he led the American League in saves with 34. 
Starting pitcher Jimmy Key led the American League with a 2.76 ERA.
 July 21, 1987: Jimmy Key threw exactly three pitches and recorded three outs. This was accomplished in the second inning.
September 14, 1987: The Blue Jays set a Major League record by hitting 10 home runs in a game against the Baltimore Orioles.

Season standings

Record vs. opponents

Notable transactions
 April 2, 1987: Bill Caudill was released by the Blue Jays.
 June 2, 1987: 1987 Major League Baseball draft
Ryan Thompson was drafted by the Blue Jays in the 13th round. Player signed June 4, 1987.
Steve Wapnick was drafted by the Blue Jays in the 30th round.
Darren Lewis was drafted by the Blue Jays in the 45th round, but did not sign.
 August 25, 1987: Gary Lavelle was released by the Blue Jays.
 August 31, 1987: Oswaldo Peraza and a player to be named later were traded by the Blue Jays to the Baltimore Orioles for Mike Flanagan. The Blue Jays completed the deal by sending José Mesa to the Orioles on September 4.
 September 22, 1987: Mike Sharperson was traded by the Blue Jays to the Los Angeles Dodgers for Juan Guzmán.

Roster

Game log

|- align="center" bgcolor="bbffbb"
| 1 || April 6 || Indians || 7 – 3 || Key (1-0) || Candiotti (0-1) || || 40,404 || 1-0
|- align="center" bgcolor="bbffbb"
| 2 || April 8 || Indians || 5 – 1 || Clancy (1-0) || Swindell (0-1) || || 20,388 || 2-0
|- align="center" bgcolor="ffbbbb"
| 3 || April 9 || Indians || 14 – 3 || Niekro (1-0) || Johnson (0-1) || Carlton (1) || 21,088 || 2-1
|- align="center" bgcolor="ffbbbb"
| 4 || April 10 || @ Red Sox || 3 – 0 || Hurst (1-0) || Stieb (0-1) || || 33,679 || 2-2
|- align="center" bgcolor="bbffbb"
| 5 || April 11 || @ Red Sox || 11 – 1 || Key (2-0) || Clemens (0-1) || || 33,365 || 3-2
|- align="center" bgcolor="ffbbbb"
| 6 || April 12 || @ Red Sox || 8 – 3 || Stanley (1-1) || Clancy (1-1) || || 27,521 || 3-3
|- align="center" bgcolor="bbffbb"
| 7 || April 14 || White Sox || 4 – 3 (13) || Eichhorn (1-0) || McKeon (0-1) || || 17,324 || 4-3
|- align="center" bgcolor="ffbbbb"
| 8 || April 15 || White Sox || 5 – 0 || DeLeón (2-0) || Stieb (0-2) || || 17,285 || 4-4
|- align="center" bgcolor="bbffbb"
| 9 || April 16 || Red Sox || 4 – 2 || Key (3-0) || Clemens (0-2) || Henke (1) || 22,065 || 5-4
|- align="center" bgcolor="bbffbb"
| 10 || April 17 || Red Sox || 10 – 5 || Cerutti (1-0) || | Stanley (1-2) || Eichhorn (1) || 36,400 || 6-4
|- align="center" bgcolor="ffbbbb"
| 11 || April 18 || Red Sox || 6 – 4 || Sellers (1-0) || Clancy (1-2) || Schiraldi (2) || 39,107 || 6-5
|- align="center" bgcolor="ffbbbb"
| 12 || April 19 || Red Sox || 4 – 1 || Nipper (2-0) || Johnson (0-2) || Gardner (2) || 28,140 || 6-6
|- align="center" bgcolor="bbffbb"
| 13 || April 20 || @ Indians || 8 – 7 (10) || Musselman (1-0) || Jones (0-1) ||  || 11,164 || 7-6
|- align="center" bgcolor="ffbbbb"
| 14 || April 21 || @ Indians || 5 – 0 || Candiotti (1-3) || Key (3-1) || || 7,203 || 7-7
|- align="center" bgcolor="bbffbb"
| 15 || April 22 || @ Indians || 6 – 3 || Eichhorn (2-0) || Carlton (1-2) || Henke (2) || 6,000 || 8-7
|- align="center" bgcolor="bbffbb"
| 16 || April 24 || @ White Sox || 4 – 2 (10) || Eichhorn (3-0) || James (0-1) || Henke (3) || 10,105 || 9-7
|- align="center" bgcolor="ffbbbb"
| 17 || April 25 || @ White Sox || 5 – 4 || James (1-1) || Eichhorn (3-1) || || 18,644 || 9-8
|- align="center" bgcolor="bbffbb"
| 18 || April 26 || @ White Sox || 5 – 2 || Key (4-1) || DeLeón (2-2) || Henke (4) || 20,443 || 10-8
|- align="center" bgcolor="bbffbb"
| 19 || April 28 || Twins || 5 – 1 || Clancy (2-2) || Viola (1-3) || || 21,182 || 11-8
|- align="center" bgcolor="bbffbb"
| 20 || April 29 || Twins || 8 – 1 || Johnson (1-2) || Smithson (3-1) || || 19,020 || 12-8
|-

|- align="center" bgcolor="bbffbb"
| 21 || May 1 || Rangers || 3 – 2 (10) || Musselman (2-0) || Williams (2-2) || || 22,154 || 13-8
|- align="center" bgcolor="bbffbb"
| 22 || May 2 || Rangers || 9 – 8 || Eichhorn (4-1) || Harris (1-3) || || 28,352 || 14-8
|- align="center" bgcolor="bbffbb"
| 23 || May 3 || Rangers || 3 – 1 || Clancy (3-2) || Correa (1-2) || Henke (5) || 32,325 || 15-8
|- align="center" bgcolor="bbbbbb"
| -- || May 4 || @ Royals || colspan=6|Postponed (rain) Rescheduled for July 3
|- align="center" bgcolor="ffbbbb"
| 24 || May 5 || @ Royals || 6 – 4 || Leibrandt (4-1) || Johnson (1-3) || Gleaton (1) || 19,245 || 15-9
|- align="center" bgcolor="ffbbbb"
| 25 || May 6 || @ Royals || 6 – 3 || Black (1-0) || Key (4-2) || Gleaton (2) || 28,083 || 15-10
|- align="center" bgcolor="bbffbb"
| 26 || May 8 || @ Rangers || 7 – 4 || Clancy (4-2) || Guzmán (1-2) || Eichhorn (2) || 21,832 || 16-10
|- align="center" bgcolor="bbffbb"
| 27 || May 9 || @ Rangers || 15 – 4 || Stieb (1-2) || Correa (1-3) || || 28,847 || 17-10
|- align="center" bgcolor="ffbbbb"
| 28 || May 10 || @ Rangers || 9 – 8 || Witt (1-1) || Eichhorn (4-2) || Mohorcic (3) || 17,356 || 17-11
|- align="center" bgcolor="bbffbb"
| 29 || May 11 || Royals || 4 – 0 || Key (5-2) || Leibrandt (4-2) || || 24,154 || 18-11
|- align="center" bgcolor="ffbbbb"
| 30 || May 12 || Royals || 3 – 1 || Black (2-0) || Cerutti (1-1) || Quisenberry (3) || 30,034 || 18-12
|- align="center" bgcolor="bbffbb"
| 31 || May 13 || @ Twins || 7 – 0 || Clancy (5-2) || Portugal (1-2) || || 9,158 || 19-12
|- align="center" bgcolor="bbffbb"
| 32 || May 14 || @ Twins || 16 – 4 || Stieb (2-2) || Straker (2-1) ||  || 10,053 || 20-12
|- align="center" bgcolor="bbffbb"
| 33 || May 15 || @ Athletics || 3 – 2 || Johnson (2-3) || Plunk (1-2) || Henke (6) || 13,139 || 21-12
|- align="center" bgcolor="ffbbbb"
| 34 || May 16 || @ Athletics || 10 – 3 || Haas (1-0) || Key (5-3) ||  || 20,900 || 21-13
|- align="center" bgcolor="ffbbbb"
| 35 || May 17 || @ Athletics || 3 – 0 || Stewart (5-3) || Cerutti (1-2) || || 30,511 || 21-14
|- align="center" bgcolor="bbffbb"
| 36 || May 18 || @ Angels || 12 – 0 || Clancy (6-2) || Cook (1-2) || || 23,710 || 22-14
|- align="center" bgcolor="ffbbbb"
| 37 || May 19 || @ Angels || 2 – 1 || Buice (2-2) || Musselman (2-1) || Moore (5) || 23,622 || 22-15
|- align="center" bgcolor="ffbbbb"
| 38 || May 20 || @ Angels || 5 – 4 (10) || Lucas (1-1) || Henke (0-1) || || 23,766 || 22-16
|- align="center" bgcolor="bbffbb"
| 39 || May 22 || @ Mariners || 7 – 5 || Eichhorn (5-2) || Bankhead (5-3) || Henke (7) || 10,012 || 23-16
|- align="center" bgcolor="bbffbb"
| 40 || May 23 || @ Mariners || 6 – 2 || Clancy (7-2) || Moore (2-5) || || 13,489 || 21-12
|- align="center" bgcolor="ffbbbb"
| 41 || May 24 || @ Mariners || 5 – 2 || Langston (5-4) || Stieb (2-3) || || 12,751 || 24-17
|- align="center" bgcolor="bbffbb"
| 42 || May 25 || @ Mariners || 6 – 5 || Key (6-3) || Morgan (4-5) || Musselman (1) || 8,499 || 25-17
|- align="center" bgcolor="ffbbbb"
| 43 || May 27 || Athletics || 4 – 1 || Haas (2-1) || Johnson (2-4) || Ontiveros (1) || 25,245 || 25-18
|- align="center" bgcolor="ffbbbb"
| 44 || May 28 || Athletics || 4 – 3 || Stewart (6-4) || Clancy (7-3) || Leiper (1) || 27,017 || 25-19
|- align="center" bgcolor="bbffbb"
| 45 || May 29 || Angels || 3 – 1 || Stieb (3-3) || Sutton (2-5) || Henke (8) || 33,107 || 26-19
|- align="center" bgcolor="bbffbb"
| 46 || May 30 || Angels || 4 – 3 (10) || Eichhorn (6-2) || Lazorko (0-2) || || 36,055 || 27-19
|- align="center" bgcolor="bbffbb"
| 47 || May 31 || Angels || 7 – 2 || Cerutti (2-2) || Candelaria (4-2) || || 40,313 || 28-19
|-

|- align="center" bgcolor="ffbbbb"
| 48 || June 1 || Mariners || 2 – 0 || Bankhead (6-3) || Johnson (2-5) || Wilkinson (2) || 28,294 || 28-20
|- align="center" bgcolor="bbffbb"
| 49 || June 2 || Mariners || 4 – 3 || Musselman (3-1) || Moore (2-7) || Henke (9) || 31,076 || 29-20
|- align="center" bgcolor="bbffbb"
| 50 || June 3 || Mariners || 7 – 2 || Stieb (4-3) || Langston (6-5) || Eichhorn (3) || 30,502 || 30-20
|- align="center" bgcolor="bbffbb"
| 51 || June 5 || Orioles || 6 – 2 || Key (7-3) || Bell (5-3) || || 32,514 || 31-20
|- align="center" bgcolor="bbffbb"
| 52 || June 6 || Orioles || 8 – 5 (11) || Musselman (4-1) || Dixon (3-5) || || 36,345 || 32-20
|- align="center" bgcolor="bbffbb"
| 53 || June 7 || Orioles || 3 – 2 || Eichhorn (7-2) || Boddicker (5-2) || || 42,254 || 33-20
|- align="center" bgcolor="bbffbb"
| 54 || June 8 || @ Yankees || 11 – 0 || Stieb (5-3) || Rhoden (6-4) || || 25,526 || 34-20
|- align="center" bgcolor="bbffbb"
| 55 || June 9 || @ Yankees || 7 – 2 || Cerutti (3-2) || Guidry (0-2) || || 29,765 || 35-20
|- align="center" bgcolor="bbffbb"
| 56 || June 10 || @ Yankees || 4 – 1 || Key (8-3) || John (6-2) || Henke (10) || 26,806 || 36-20
|- align="center" bgcolor="bbffbb"
| 57 || June 11 || @ Orioles || 8 – 6 || Johnson (3-5) || Habyan (1-2) || Henke (11) || 17,409 || 37-20
|- align="center" bgcolor="bbffbb"
| 58 || June 12 || @ Orioles || 8 – 5 || Eichhorn (8-2) || Boddicker (5-3) || Musselman (2) || 27,521 || 38-20
|- align="center" bgcolor="bbffbb"
| 59 || June 13 || @ Orioles || 8 – 2 || Cerutti (4-2) || McGregor (2-6) || || 25,359 || 39-20
|- align="center" bgcolor="ffbbbb"
| 60 || June 14 || @ Orioles || 8 – 5 || Schmidt (7-1) || Eichhorn (8-3) || DeLeón (1) || 31,358 || 39-21
|- align="center" bgcolor="ffbbbb"
| 61 || June 15 || Tigers || 2 – 1 || Terrell (5-6) || Key (8-4) || King (4) || 36,225 || 39-22
|- align="center" bgcolor="bbffbb"
| 62 || June 16 || Tigers || 10 – 4 || Lavelle (1-0) || Robinson (4-3) || || 36,398 || 40-22
|- align="center" bgcolor="ffbbbb"
| 63 || June 17 || Tigers || 3 – 2 || Tanana (6-3) || Clancy (7-4) || Hernández (2) || 46,227 || 40-23
|- align="center" bgcolor="ffbbbb"
| 64 || June 18 || Brewers || 6 – 3 || Nieves (5-4) || Stieb (5-4) || Plesac (15) || 31,353 || 40-24
|- align="center" bgcolor="bbffbb"
| 65 || June 19 || Brewers || 15 – 6 || Musselman (5-1) || Clear (5-2) || || 31,230 || 41-24
|- align="center" bgcolor="ffbbbb"
| 66 || June 20 || Brewers || 3 – 2 || Wegman (6-6) || Key (8-5) || Plesac (16) || 38,465 || 41-25
|- align="center" bgcolor="bbffbb"
| 67 || June 21 || Brewers || 7 – 6 || Musselman (6-1) || Crim (3-5) || Henke (12) || 44,444 || 42-25
|- align="center" bgcolor="ffbbbb"
| 68 || June 22 || @ Tigers || 2 – 0 || Tanana (7-3) || Clancy (7-5) || || 28,978 || 42-26
|- align="center" bgcolor="bbffbb"
| 69 || June 23 || @ Tigers || 8 – 7 || Stieb (6-4) || Robinson (4-4) || Henke (13) || 29,275 || 43-26
|- align="center" bgcolor="bbffbb"
| 70 || June 24 || @ Tigers || 5 – 3 || Cerutti (5-2) || Morris (10-3) || Musselman (3) || 34,866 || 44-26
|- align="center" bgcolor="ffbbbb"
| 71 || June 26 || @ Brewers || 10 – 5 || Plesac (4-0) || Henke (0-2) ||  || 29,461 || 44-27
|- align="center" bgcolor="bbffbb"
| 72 || June 27 || @ Brewers || 8 – 1 || Clancy (8-5) || Nieves (5-5) || || 48,159 || 45-27
|- align="center" bgcolor="ffbbbb"
| 73 || June 28 || @ Brewers || 11 – 5 || Higuera (6-7) || Stieb (6-5) || || 42,389 || 45-28
|- align="center" bgcolor="ffbbbb"
| 74 || June 29 || Yankees || 15 – 14 || Righetti (5-3) || Henke (0-3) || || 42,179 || 45-29
|- align="center" bgcolor="ffbbbb"
| 75 || June 30 || Yankees || 4 – 0 || Guidry (1-3) || Wells (0-1) || || 45,297 || 45-30
|-

|- align="center" bgcolor="ffbbbb"
| 76 || July 1 || Yankees || 6 – 1 (12) || Clements (2-0) || Musselman (6-2) || || 47,828 || 45-31
|- align="center" bgcolor="ffbbbb"
| 77 || July 3 || @ Royals || 6 – 4 || Gubicza (7-8) || Clancy (8-6) || Gleaton (4) ||  || 45-32
|- align="center" bgcolor="ffbbbb"
| 78 || July 3 || @ Royals || 5 – 4 || Farr (3-2) || Henke (0-4) || || 40,619 || 45-33
|- align="center" bgcolor="ffbbbb"
| 79 || July 4 || @ Royals || 9 – 1 || Black (4-2) || Wells (0-2) || Stoddard (1) || 40,746 || 45-34
|- align="center" bgcolor="ffbbbb"
| 80 || July 5 || @ Royals || 4 – 3 (10) || Quisenberry (4-0) || Eichhorn (8-4) || || 25,607 || 45-35
|- align="center" bgcolor="bbffbb"
| 81 || July 6 || Rangers || 6 – 4 || Key (9-5) || Hough (9-4) || Henke (14) || 28,264 || 46-35
|- align="center" bgcolor="bbffbb"
| 82 || July 7 || Rangers || 6 – 2 || Clancy (9-6) || Loynd (1-5) || Henke (15) || 28,013 || 47-35
|- align="center" bgcolor="bbffbb"
| 83 || July 8 || Rangers || 5 – 2 || Musselman (7-2) || Witt (4-4) || Henke (16) || 30,341 || 48-35
|- align="center" bgcolor="bbffbb"
| 84 || July 9 || Royals || 7 – 1 || Núñez (1-0) || Black (4-3) || || 31,290 || 49-35
|- align="center" bgcolor="bbffbb"
| 85 || July 10 || Royals || 7 – 0 || Stieb (7-5) || Leibrandt (8-7) || || 35,200 || 50-35
|- align="center" bgcolor="ffbbbb"
| 86 || July 11 || Royals || 2 – 1 || Saberhagen (15-3) || Key (9-6) || || 38,289 || 50-36
|- align="center" bgcolor="bbffbb"
| 87 || July 12 || Royals || 3 – 2 || Clancy (10-6) || Black (4-4)|| Henke (17) || 40,268 || 51-36
|- align="center" bgcolor="bbffbb"
| 88 || July 16 || @ Twins || 5 – 2 || Key (10-6) || Blyleven (8-7)|| Henke (18) || 34,334 || 52-36
|- align="center" bgcolor="ffbbbb"
| 89 || July 17 || @ Twins || 3 – 2 || Viola (9-6) || Eichhorn (8-5) || Reardon (18) || 28,234 || 52-37
|- align="center" bgcolor="bbffbb"
| 90 || July 18 || @ Twins || 7 – 5 || Stieb (8-5) || Niekro (5-7) || || 38,365 || 53-37
|- align="center" bgcolor="ffbbbb"
| 91 || July 19 || @ Twins || 7 – 6 || Schatzeder (1-0) || Lavelle (1-1) || Reardon (19) || 32,095 || 53-38
|- align="center" bgcolor="bbffbb"
| 92 || July 20 || @ Rangers || 5 – 3 || Cerutti (6-2) || Hough (10-6) || Henke (19) || 27,501 || 54-38
|- align="center" bgcolor="ffbbbb"
| 93 || July 21 || @ Rangers || 6 – 4 || Mohorcic (6-2) || Musselman (7-3)|| || 13,791 || 54-39
|- align="center" bgcolor="ffbbbb"
| 94 || July 22 || @ Rangers || 5 – 3 || Russell (3-1) || Lavelle (1-2) || Mohorcic (13) || 16,380 || 54-40
|- align="center" bgcolor="bbffbb"
| 95 || July 23 || Twins || 4 – 3 || Stieb (9-5) || Frazier (5-5) ||  || 35,320 || 55-40
|- align="center" bgcolor="bbffbb"
| 96 || July 24 || Twins || 8 – 6 || Eichhorn (9-5) || Reardon (5-5)|| Henke (20) || 30,382 || 56-40
|- align="center" bgcolor="ffbbbb"
| 97 || July 25 || Twins || 13 – 9 || Schatzeder (2-0) || Musselman (7-4)|| || 36,395 || 56-41
|- align="center" bgcolor="bbffbb"
| 98 || July 26 || Twins || 4 – 2 || Key (11-6) || Blyleven (9-8) || Henke (21) || 33,353 || 57-41
|- align="center" bgcolor="bbffbb"
| 99 || July 27 || Red Sox || 10 – 8 || Musselman (8-4) || Schiraldi (5-5)|| Henke (22) || 35,425 || 58-41
|- align="center" bgcolor="bbffbb"
| 100 || July 28 || Red Sox || 5 – 4 || Musselman (9-4) || Sambito (1-3)|| Henke (23) || 36,122 || 59-41
|- align="center" bgcolor="ffbbbb"
| 101 || July 29 || Red Sox || 6 – 5 || Schiraldi (6-5) || Lavelle (1-3) || || 35,052 || 59-42
|- align="center" bgcolor="bbffbb"
| 102 || July 31 || Indians || 8 – 3 || Key (12-6) || Ritter (0-1) ||  || 30,256 || 60-42
|-

|- align="center" bgcolor="ffbbbb"
| 103 || August 1 || Indians || 3 – 0 || Bailes (4-4) || Clancy (10-7) || Stewart (2) || 38,435 || 60-43
|- align="center" bgcolor="bbffbb"
| 104 || August 2 || Indians || 11 – 5 || Stieb (10-5) || Akerfelds (0-2) || Lavelle (1)  || 33,351 || 61-43
|- align="center" bgcolor="bbffbb"
| 105 || August 3 || @ White Sox || 14 – 5 || Musselman (10-4) || Bannister (6-9) || || 12,193 || 62-43
|- align="center" bgcolor="bbffbb"
| 106 || August 4 || @ White Sox || 4 – 1 || Cerutti (7-2) || Allen (0-6) || Henke (24) || 13,319 || 63-43
|- align="center" bgcolor="bbffbb"
| 107 || August 5 || @ White Sox || 3 – 2 || Key (13-6) || Dotson (8-8) || Henke (25) || 13,360 || 64-43
|- align="center" bgcolor="ffbbbb"
| 108 || August 6 || @ Indians || 14 – 5 || Bailes (5-4) || Clancy (10-8) || || 7,978 || 64-44
|- align="center" bgcolor="bbffbb"
| 109 || August 7 || @ Indians || 15 – 1 || Stieb (11-5) || Akerfelds (0-3) ||  || 24,049 || 65-44
|- align="center" bgcolor="ffbbbb"
| 110 || August 8 || @ Indians || 3 – 1 || Candiotti (5-11) || Núñez (1-1) ||  || 16,706 || 65-45
|- align="center" bgcolor="bbffbb"
| 111 || August 9 || @ Indians || 5 – 1 || Cerutti (8-2) || Schrom (5-8) ||  || 13,890 || 66-45
|- align="center" bgcolor="ffbbbb"
| 112 || August 10 || @ Red Sox || 9 – 1 || Clemens (12-7) || Clancy (10-9) ||  || 30,606 || 66-46
|- align="center" bgcolor="bbffbb"
| 113 || August 11 || @ Red Sox || 8 – 3 || Key (14-6) || | Stanley (3-12) ||  || 32,555 || 67-46
|- align="center" bgcolor="bbffbb"
| 114 || August 12 || @ Red Sox || 10 – 4 || Stieb (12-5) || Sellers (4-5) ||  || 33,403 || 68-46
|- align="center" bgcolor="ffbbbb"
| 115 || August 13 || White Sox || 10 – 3 || Bannister (8-9) || Niekro (7-12) ||  || 45,152 || 68-47
|- align="center" bgcolor="bbffbb"
| 116 || August 14 || White Sox || 3 – 2 || Cerutti (9-2) || DeLeón (5-11) || Henke (26) || 37,236 || 69-47
|- align="center" bgcolor="ffbbbb"
| 117 || August 15 || White Sox || 1 – 0 || Dotson (10-8) || Clancy (10-10) ||  || 37,155 || 69-48
|- align="center" bgcolor="bbffbb"
| 118 || August 16 || White Sox || 6 – 4 || Eichhorn (10-5) || Searage (2-3) || Henke (27) || 41,384 || 70-48
|- align="center" bgcolor="bbffbb"
| 119 || August 18 || @ Athletics || 2 – 1 || Stieb (13-5) || Eckersley (6-6) || Henke (28)  || 34,823 || 71-48
|- align="center" bgcolor="ffbbbb"
| 120 || August 19 || @ Athletics || 7 – 3 || Stewart (17-8) || Cerutti (9-3) ||  || 16,039 || 71-49
|- align="center" bgcolor="bbffbb"
| 121 || August 20 || @ Athletics || 7 – 6 || Lavelle (2-3) || Cadaret (2-1) || Henke (29) || 12,607 || 72-49
|- align="center" bgcolor="ffbbbb"
| 122 || August 21 || @ Angels || 3 – 1 || Reuss (4-1) || Niekro (7-13) || Minton (10) || 47,925 || 72-50
|- align="center" bgcolor="bbffbb"
| 123 || August 22 || @ Angels || 2 – 0 || Núñez (2-1) || Witt (15-9) || Henke (30) || 34,209 || 73-50
|- align="center" bgcolor="ffbbbb"
| 124 || August 23 || @ Angels || 5 – 2 || McCaskill (4-5) || Stieb (13-6) || Buice (14) || 42,000 || 73-51
|- align="center" bgcolor="bbffbb"
| 125 || August 24 || @ Mariners || 7 – 3 || Cerutti (10-3) || Morgan (10-14) ||  || 11,869 || 74-51
|- align="center" bgcolor="bbffbb"
| 126 || August 25 || @ Mariners || 6 – 3 || Clancy (11-10) || Moore (6-16) || Eichhorn (4) || 12,367 || 75-51
|- align="center" bgcolor="bbffbb"
| 127 || August 27 || Athletics || 9 – 4 || Key (15-6) || Cadaret (3-2) ||  || 38,026 || 76-51
|- align="center" bgcolor="ffbbbb"
| 128 || August 28 || Athletics || 3 – 2 || Stewart (18-9) || Stieb (13-7) || Eckersley (10) || 32,256 || 76-52
|- align="center" bgcolor="ffbbbb"
| 129 || August 29 || Athletics || 6 – 5 (10) || Plunk (2-4) || Eichhorn (10-6) || Eckersley (11) || 42,388 || 76-53
|- align="center" bgcolor="bbffbb"
| 130 || August 30 || Athletics || 13 – 3 || Clancy (12-10) || Rijo (2-7) ||  || 38,211 || 77-53
|- align="center" bgcolor="ffbbbb"
| 131 || August 31 || Angels || 8 – 7 (11) || Fraser (9-8) || Henke (0-5) || Lucas (3) || 30,224 || 77-54
|-

|- align="center" bgcolor="bbffbb"
| 132 || September 1 || Angels || 4 – 3 (10) || Musselman (11-4) || Witt (15-10) || || 31,101 || 78-54
|- align="center" bgcolor="bbffbb"
| 133 || September 2 || Angels || 7 – 6 || Wells (1-2) || Buice (5-6) || || 33,408 || 79-54
|- align="center" bgcolor="bbffbb"
| 134 || September 4 || Mariners || 6 – 5 (10) || Núñez (3-1) || Powell (0-3) || || 33,042 || 80-54
|- align="center" bgcolor="bbffbb"
| 135 || September 5 || Mariners || 3 – 0 || Flanagan (4-6) || Campbell (0-3) || Henke (31) || 38,436 || 81-54
|- align="center" bgcolor="bbffbb"
| 136 || September 6 || Mariners || 3 – 2 (11) || Núñez (4-1) || Núñez (3-3) || || 44,287 || 82-54
|- align="center" bgcolor="bbffbb"
| 137 || September 7 || @ Brewers || 5 – 3 || Ward (1-0) || Plesac (5-6) || Henke (32) || 16,935 || 83-54
|- align="center" bgcolor="ffbbbb"
| 138 || September 8 || @ Brewers || 6 – 4 || Bosio (10-5) || Stieb (13-8) || Crim (9) || 8,053 || 83-55
|- align="center" bgcolor="ffbbbb"
| 139 || September 9 || @ Brewers || 6 – 4 || Clear (7-5) || Wells (1-3) || || 10,555 || 83-56
|- align="center" bgcolor="bbffbb"
| 140 || September 11 || Yankees || 6 – 5 (10) || Wells (2-3) || Righetti (7-4) || || 38,540 || 84-56
|- align="center" bgcolor="bbffbb"
| 141 || September 12 || Yankees || 13 – 1 || Key (16-6) || Rhoden (16-10) || || 45,648 || 85-56
|- align="center" bgcolor="ffbbbb"
| 142 || September 13 || Yankees || 8 – 5 || Hudson (10-6) || Cerutti (10-4) || Righetti (27) || 45,312 || 85-57
|- align="center" bgcolor="bbffbb"
| 143 || September 14 || Orioles || 18 – 3 || Clancy (13-10) || Dixon (7-10) || || 27,446 || 86-57
|- align="center" bgcolor="bbffbb"
| 144 || September 15 || Orioles || 6 – 2 || Flanagan (5-6) || Mesa (0-1) || || 27,192 || 87-57
|- align="center" bgcolor="bbffbb"
| 145 || September 16 || Orioles || 7 – 0 || Key (17-6) || Boddicker (10-9) || || 29,353 || 88-57
|- align="center" bgcolor="ffbbbb"
| 146 || September 17 || @ Yankees || 6 – 5 || Righetti (8-4) || Henke (0-6) || || 27,032 || 88-58
|- align="center" bgcolor="bbffbb"
| 147 || September 18 || @ Yankees || 6 – 3 || Clancy (14-10) || Allen (0-8) || Wells (1) || 34,110 || 89-58
|- align="center" bgcolor="ffbbbb"
| 148 || September 19 || @ Yankees || 4 – 2 || Gullickson (3-2) || Flanagan (5-7) || Righetti (29) || 38,239 || 89-59
|- align="center" bgcolor="bbffbb"
| 149 || September 20 || @ Yankees || 6 – 2 || Wells (3-3) || Leiter (1-1) || || 45,267 || 90-59
|- align="center" bgcolor="bbffbb"
| 150 || September 21 || @ Orioles || 2 – 1 || Cerutti (11-4) || Boddicker (10-10) || Henke (33) || 13,683 || 91-59
|- align="center" bgcolor="bbffbb"
| 151 || September 22 || @ Orioles || 8 – 4 || Wells (4-3) || Ballard (2-7) || || 13,923 || 92-59
|- align="center" bgcolor="bbffbb"
| 152 || September 23 || @ Orioles || 6 – 1 || Clancy (15-10) || Habyan (5-6) || || 22,590 || 93-59
|- align="center" bgcolor="bbffbb"
| 153 || September 24 || Tigers || 4 – 3 || Flanagan (6-7) || Morris (18-10) || Henke (34) || 42,436 || 94-59
|- align="center" bgcolor="bbffbb"
| 154 || September 25 || Tigers || 3 – 2 || Musselman (12-4) || Hernández (3-4) || || 46,233 || 95-59
|- align="center" bgcolor="bbffbb"
| 155 || September 26 || Tigers || 10 – 9 || Núñez (5-1) || Henneman (9-3) || || 46,429 || 96-59
|- align="center" bgcolor="ffbbbb"
| 156 || September 27 || Tigers || 3 – 2 (13) || Henneman (10-3) || Núñez (5-2) || Noles (2) || 46,346 || 96-60
|- align="center" bgcolor="ffbbbb"
| 157 || September 28 || Brewers || 6 – 4 || Wegman (11-11) || Flanagan (6-8) || Clear (6) || 34,113 || 96-61
|- align="center" bgcolor="ffbbbb"
| 158 || September 29 || Brewers || 5 – 3 || Bosio (11-7) || Key (17-7) || || 34,314 || 96-62
|- align="center" bgcolor="ffbbbb"
| 159 || September 30 || Brewers || 5 – 2 || Nieves (14-8) || Stieb (13-9) || || 35,245 || 96-63
|-

|- align="center" bgcolor="ffbbbb"
| 160 || October 2 || @ Tigers || 4 – 3 || Alexander (9-0) || Clancy (15-11) || Henneman (7) || 45,167 || 96-64
|- align="center" bgcolor="ffbbbb"
| 161 || October 3 || @ Tigers || 3 – 2 (12) || Henneman (11-3) || Musselman (12-5) || || 45,026 || 96-65
|- align="center" bgcolor="ffbbbb"
| 162 || October 4 || @ Tigers || 1 – 0 || Tanana (15-10) || Key (17-8) || || 51,005 || 96-66
|-

Player stats

Batting

Starters by position
Note: Pos = Position; G = Games played; AB = At bats; H = Hits; Avg. = Batting average; HR = Home runs; RBI = Runs batted in

Other batters
Note: G = Games played; AB = At bats; H = Hits; Avg. = Batting average; HR = Home runs; RBI = Runs batted in

Pitching

Starting pitchers
Note: G = Games pitched; IP = Innings pitched; W = Wins; L = Losses; ERA = Earned run average; SO = Strikeouts

Other pitchers
Note: G = Games pitched; IP = Innings pitched; W = Wins; L = Losses; ERA = Earned run average; SO = Strikeouts

Relief pitchers
Note: G = Games pitched; W = Wins; L = Losses; SV = Saves; ERA = Earned run average; SO = Strikeouts

Award winners
Jesse Barfield, Gold Glove Award
George Bell, American League RBI Champion, 134
 George Bell, American League MVP
 George Bell, Silver Slugger Award
 George Bell, The Sporting News Player of the Year Award
Jim Clancy, Pitcher of the Month Award, May
Tony Fernández, Gold Glove Award
Tom Henke, American League Leader, Saves, 34
Jimmy Key, American League ERA Champion, 2.76 ERA

All-Star Game
 George Bell, OF, starter
 Tony Fernández, shortstop, reserve 
 Tom Henke, pitcher, reserve

Farm system

LEAGUE CHAMPIONS: Myrtle Beach

References

External links
1987 Toronto Blue Jays at Baseball Reference
1987 Toronto Blue Jays at Baseball Almanac
The Fall of '87 — Sportsnet article by Gare Joyce

Toronto Blue Jays seasons
Toronto Blue Jays season
1987 in Canadian sports
1987 in Toronto